The 2023 Patriot League Men's Basketball Tournament was the conference postseason tournament for the Patriot League. The tournament was held February 28, March 2, 5, and 8, 2023 at campus sites of the higher seeds. The winner, Colgate, received the conference's automatic bid to the NCAA Tournament.

Seeds 
All ten teams in the conference standings qualify for the tournament. The teams will be seeded by record in conference, with a tiebreaker system to seed teams with identical conference records.

The two tiebreakers used by the Patriot League are: 1) head-to-head record of teams with identical record and 2) NCAA NET Rankings available on day following the conclusion of Patriot League regular season play.

Schedule

Bracket 

* denotes overtime period

References 

Tournament
Patriot League men's basketball tournament
Patriot League men's basketball tournament